"Möt mig i Gamla stan" is a song written by Thomas G:son and Lina Eriksson, and performed by Magnus Carlsson at Melodifestivalen 2015, where the song ended up 9th in the final.

Chart positions

References 

2015 singles
Magnus Carlsson songs
Melodifestivalen songs of 2015
Songs about Stockholm
Songs written by Lina Eriksson
Songs written by Thomas G:son
Universal Music Group singles
2015 songs